Numerous states have ceased their diplomatic recognition of the Republic of China during the last 70 years, since the founding of the People's Republic of China.

Timeline

The timeline of diplomatic relations of the Republic of China encompasses the years from 1912 to 1949 (the establishment of the People's Republic of China), and the year of the Taipei Economic and Cultural Representative Office (TECRO) establishments as a substitute for embassies in the absence of official diplomatic relations with the ROC.

See also 

 Foreign relations of Taiwan

 Foreign relations of China
 Dates of establishment of diplomatic relations with the People's Republic of China

References

Sources 
 中華民國與各國建交斷交大事紀 

Foreign relations of Taiwan
Cross-Strait relations
Taiwan diplomacy-related lists
Political timelines